During the 1991–92 English football season, Everton F.C. competed in the Football League First Division.

Season summary
The summer of 1991 saw the departure of Everton hero Graeme Sharp but the attack was bolstered by Peter Beardsley who was signed from Liverpool and Mo Johnston from Rangers.

Despite these changes to the squad, in the 1991–92 season Everton continued to deteriorate, finishing 12th - their lowest finish for more than a decade.

Final league table

Results
Everton's score comes first

Legend

Football League First Division

FA Cup

League Cup

Full Members' Cup

Squad

Transfers

In

Out

Transfers in:  £4,400,000
Transfers out:  £3,650,000
Total spending:  £750,000

References

Everton F.C. seasons
Everton
Everton F.C. season